Nguyễn Văn Phương (born 27 February 2001) is a Vietnamese tennis player.

Nguyễn has a career high ATP singles ranking of 1332 achieved on 21 May 2018. He also has a career high ATP doubles ranking of 1098 achieved on 17 December 2018.

Nguyễn has a career-high ITF juniors ranking of 44, achieved on 31 December 2018.

Nguyễn represents Vietnam at the Davis Cup, where he has a W/L record of 0–1.

Future and Challenger finals

Doubles: 1 (1–0)

Davis Cup

Participations: (0–1)

   indicates the outcome of the Davis Cup match followed by the score, date, place of event, the zonal classification and its phase, and the court surface.

References

External links

2001 births
Living people
Vietnamese male tennis players
People from Bình Dương Province
Southeast Asian Games medalists in tennis
Southeast Asian Games bronze medalists for Vietnam
Competitors at the 2019 Southeast Asian Games
Competitors at the 2021 Southeast Asian Games